Nikolay Tatarinov (14 December 1927 – 29 May 2017) was a Soviet modern pentathlete and Olympic medalist. He competed at the 1960 Summer Olympics in Rome, where he won a silver medal in the team competition, and placed sixth in the individual competition.

References

External links

1927 births
2017 deaths
Russian male modern pentathletes
Soviet male modern pentathletes
Olympic modern pentathletes of the Soviet Union
Modern pentathletes at the 1960 Summer Olympics
Olympic silver medalists for the Soviet Union
Olympic medalists in modern pentathlon
Medalists at the 1960 Summer Olympics